Hans Raj Hans is an Indian singer who later became a politician. He is a member of Bharatiya Janata Party and a recipient of the civilian honour of Padma Shri.

He sings Punjabi folk and Sufi music as well as in movies and has also released his own 'Punjabi-pop' albums. He has worked alongside other artists, such as Nusrat Fateh Ali Khan in the movie Kachche Dhaage.

Early life
Hans Raj Hans was born in the village of Shafipur, near to Jalandhar, Punjab, India. Hans did his graduation from DAV College, Jalandhar.

Since his teen years, Hans was trained in singing by Ustad Puran Shah Koti.

In 2014, it was reported that Hans Raj converted to Islam, however he has denied this claim.

Musical career

As a youth, Hans learned from music director Charanjit Ahuja. Then he started singing Punjabi folk, devotional and Sufi music. He worked with Nusrat Fateh Ali Khan, in the movie Kachche Dhaage.

Hans has been an honorary music professor at Washington DC University and San Jose State University.

Political career
Hans joined the Shiromani Akali Dal party in January 2009 and in May of that year, he contested the Jalandhar, Punjab, India constituency.

He resigned on 18 December 2014 and joined the Indian National Congress in February 2016.

He joined Bharatiya Janata Party on 10 December 2016. He defeated and replaced Udit Raj as the candidate representing North West Delhi in the 2019 Indian general election.

Discography

Albums
2017 Mundeh Punjabi
2014 Jaadu
2011 Ek Ishaaaaa
2008 Yaara O Yaara
2007 Wanjara
2004 The Knight
2003 Tera Ishq
2002 Haaye Sohniye
2002 Ghama Di Raat
2001 Sab Ton Sohni
2001 Jhanjar
2000 Chorni
1996 Lal Garara
1994 Mohabbat
1993 Ishqe Di Barsaat
1992 Jhanjaria
1992 Aar Tutdi Naa Paar Tutdi
1991 Thah Karke
1990 Tera Mera Pyar
1990 Ashiqan Di Kahdi Zindagi
1990 Waris Punjab De
1989 Balle Ni Rahe Rahe
1987 Ek Dang Hor Mar Ja
1987 Ek Kuri Mainu Rajheon Fakir Kar Gai
1983 Jogian De Kanna Vich

Bollywood
2018 Sonu Ke Titu Ki Sweety
2011 Mausam
2011 Patiala House
2008 Black & White
2002 Bend It Like Beckham
2002 23 March 1931: Shaheed
2001 Nayak
2001 Jodi No. 1
2001 Monsoon Wedding
2000 Bichhoo
1999 Kachche Dhaage

Religious
2011 Amrit Varga Paani (with Sardool Sikander) World Music
2009 Koi Aan Milavai (featuring Sant Anoop Singh (Una Sahib Wale) & Bhai Maninder Singh (Sri Nagar Wale))
2008 300 Saala Hazoor Sahib (T-Series)
2006 Bole So Nihaal (duo collaboration with Sardool Sikander)
2006 Sikhi Diyan Shaana
2004 Nikey Nikey Do Khalse (T-Series)
2003 Wadda Mera Govind
2000 Amritdhara
1997 Mera Bajaan Wala Maahi
1991 Patta Patta Singhan Da Vairi (T-Series)

Filmography
Dupatta Tera Sat Rang Da (Speed Records)

Biography
 Rags to Ragas... and Beyond - Hans Raj Hans by Preet Inder Dhillon, Power Publishers

Accolades

References

External links

Indian male folk singers
Punjabi-language singers
People from Jalandhar
Living people
Punjabi people
1952 births
Recipients of the Padma Shri in arts
Bharatiya Janata Party politicians from Punjab
Shiromani Akali Dal politicians
Indian National Congress politicians
India MPs 2019–present